Villabre is a village in Asturias, in the north of Spain.

Populated places in Asturias